The Columbia 34 is an American sailboat that was designed by Wirth Munroe and Richard Valdez as a cruiser and first built in 1966.

The Columbia 34 is a development of the Columbia 33 Caribbean, using a deck adapted from the Columbia 40.

The Columbia 34 was replaced in the company product line  in 1970, by the unrelated William H. Tripp Jr. designed Columbia 34 Mark II.

Production
The design was built by Columbia Yachts in the United States, but it is now out of production. Some of the boats were sold as kits for owner completion.

Design
Dick Valdes described how the Columbia 34 design came about, in a talk given at the Long Beach Rendezvous on 23 February 2002. He said, "The C-33 was a fast and comfortable boat from Wirth Monroe who had designed and raced Commanche in the SORC. The boat was a direct descendent of Commanche but Wirth didn't have an eye for looks and we all called the C-33 the "Guanno" boat cause it looked like ----.! (Mike, a C-33 owner notes: they still had the nerve to market it as a "flagship" in the brochures). So after about fifty boats we decided to see if we could make a change. So we took a C-40 deck we had laying around and set it on a C-33 and it pretty much fit, and looked much better, so we took a saw and trimmed off all the overhangs and that's how the C-34 was born."

The Columbia 34 is a recreational keelboat, built predominantly of fiberglass, with wood trim. It has a masthead sloop rig, a spooned raked stem, a raised counter, transom, an internally mounted spade-type rudder controlled by a tiller and a fixed stub long keel, with a centerboard. It displaces  and carries  of ballast.

The boat is fitted with a Universal Atomic 4 gasoline engine for docking and maneuvering.

The galley is located on the port side at the bottom of the companionway steps and features a two-burner stove. The head has a privacy door and is located forward, just aft of the bow "V"-berth and opposite the hanging locker. Additional sleeping accommodation includes the main cabin dinette table, which can be converted into a double berth, a single berth on the starboard side and an aft port side quarter berth. The raised stern counter configuration precludes an aft stateroom.

See also
List of sailing boat types

Related development
Columbia 33 Caribbean
Columbia 34 Mark II
Columbia 40

Similar sailboats
Beneteau 331
Beneteau First Class 10
C&C 34
C&C 34/36
Catalina 34
Coast 34
Creekmore 34
Crown 34
CS 34
Express 34
Hunter 34
San Juan 34
Sea Sprite 34
Sun Odyssey 349
Tartan 34 C
Tartan 34-2
Viking 34

References

Keelboats
1960s sailboat type designs
Sailing yachts
Sailboat type designs by Wirth Munroe
Sailboat type designs by Richard Valdez
Sailboat types built by Columbia Yachts